Sloan Christian Struble (born August 10, 1999), is an American singer, songwriter, and producer from Aledo, Texas.  He is best known as the founder and lead of the indie pop project Dayglow. Dayglow released its debut album, Fuzzybrain, on September 28, 2018. Dayglow performing members include bassist Peyton Harrington, drummer Brady Knippa, keyboardist Norrie Swofford, guitarist Colin Crawford, and in the past have included guitarist Nate Davis, drummer Reece Myers, keyboardist Nico Fennell, bassist Eric Loop, and saxophonist Marshall Lowry.

Personal life
Struble was born in Aledo, Texas. At 11 years old, he started to work with Garageband to teach himself how to play guitar, bass, keyboard, synthesizer and drums, as well as produce and mix to create music. He started attending the University of Texas at Austin in 2018, where he studied advertising.

Career

Kindred (2016–2017) 
On October 1, 2016, under the name Kindred, Struble released his first album, also titled Kindred. Throughout 2017, Kindred released three singles. The first, a re-written version of "That's Just Life" by Francis and the Lights, was released on January 14, 2017. This was followed by "This Love" on March 6, 2017. On March 30, 2017, Struble released his last song under the name Kindred, "Spent my Life". "Spent my Life" is the only song released under the name Kindred that is available on streaming services such as Spotify, YouTube and Apple Music, while the rest of Kindred's songs are only available on SoundCloud.

Dayglow (2017–present)

2017–2020: Fuzzybrain 
In late 2017, Struble founded the solo indie pop project Dayglow. Despite being the sole member, Struble has stated that he does not view himself as a solo artist, and describes Dayglow as a band, similar to Tame Impala or Mutemath. On September 29, 2017, Dayglow released its first single, "Mindless Creatures". The next day, "Run The World!!!" was released. On January 30, 2018, Dayglow released "Can I Call You Tonight?". "Can I Call You Tonight?" became their first commercially successful song and was eventually certified Gold by the RIAA, in part due its popularity on TikTok and Spotify. On May 30, 2018, Dayglow released its fourth single, "False Direction".

On September 27, 2018, Dayglow released its first full length album, Fuzzybrain, featuring the previously released singles "Run The World!!!", "Can I Call You Tonight?", and "False Direction". Following the album release, Dayglow was invited to perform at Austin City Limits Music Festival at BMI Stage on October 12, 2019. The album cover features a clay model of Struble's head, which he molded himself. On November 13, 2019, Struble released an expanded version of Fuzzybrain, featuring the new songs "Nicknames" and "Listerine", under Acrophase Records.

2021–2022: Harmony House 
On January 11, 2021, Dayglow released its first song since 2019, "Close to You", along with an accompanying music video. On January 13, 2021, the single "Can I Call You Tonight?" was certified Gold.

On February 22, 2021, Struble announced Dayglow's second full-length album, Harmony House. On the same day, Dayglow released the album's second single, "Something". According to Struble, "Something" reflects on the way social media is used, saying, "Stuff is never going to fulfill us, yet we are always wanting more and more and it’s just such an unfortunate waste of time".

On April 1, 2021, the third single off of Harmony House, "Woah Man" was released. "Balcony" followed on May 6.

On May 21, 2021 Harmony House was released through AWAL and Struble's own label Very Nice Records, alongside a music video for the second track on the album "Medicine".

2022–present: People in Motion 
On June 21, 2022, Struble announced Dayglow's third studio album, People in Motion, alongside the lead single "Then It All Goes Away". On August 18, 2022, the second single off of People in Motion, "Deep End" was released. The following single, "Second Nature", was released on September 23, 2022.

People in Motion was released on October 7, 2022.

Style
Struble chose the name Dayglow from the song "Day Glo" by Brazos. Dayglow's music is a blend of alternative and indie pop. Washington Square News wrote that Struble's style "draws inspiration from the upbeat, groovy style of other artists such as the Doobie Brothers and Michael McDonald." Other inspirations for his musical style include Michael Jackson and Tame Impala.

Discography

Kindred

Studio albums

Singles

Dayglow

Studio albums

Singles

References

External links
 

Living people
People from Fort Worth, Texas
Singers from Texas
21st-century American singers
1999 births
21st-century American male singers